
Wysokie Mazowieckie County is a unit of territorial administration and local government (powiat) in Podlaskie Voivodeship, north-eastern Poland. It came into being on January 1, 1999, as a result of the Polish local government reforms passed in 1998.

As of 2019 its total population was 57,051, out of which the population of Wysokie Mazowieckie was 9,415, that of Ciechanowiec 4,631, that of Czyżew 2,633, that of Szepietowo 2,170, and the rural population 38,202.

Neighbouring counties
Wysokie Mazowieckie County is bordered by Białystok County and Bielsk County to the east, Siemiatycze County and Sokołów County to the south, and Ostrów Mazowiecka County and Zambrów County to the west.

Administrative division
The county is subdivided into 10 gminas (one urban, three urban-rural and six rural). These are listed in the following table, in descending order of population.

Gallery

References

 
Wysokie Mazowieckie